List of the Metropolitan bishops, archbishops, and bishops of the Russian Orthodox Church Outside Russia since 1920.

Living

First Hierarchs 
	
His Grace Bishop Nicholas of Manhattan, Newly-Elected Metropolitan of Eastern America and New York, First Hierarch of the Russian Orthodox Church Outside of Russia https://www.synod.com/synod/engrocor/enbishops.html

Metropolitans
 Mark (Arndt), Metropolitan of Berlin & Germany
Current Locum Tenens of the ROCOR

Archbishops
 Kyrill (Dmitrieff), Archbishop of San Francisco & Western America
 Gabriel (Chemodakov), Archbishop of Montreal & Canada
 Peter (Loukianoff), Archbishop of Chicago & Mid-America

Bishops
 John (Bērziņš), Bishop of Caracas and South America
 Irenei (Steenberg), Bishop of London and Western Europe
 George (Schaefer), Bishop of Canberra, vicar of the Australian Diocese
 Theodosius (Ivashchenko), Bishop of Seattle, vicar of the Western American Diocese
 Nicholas (Olhovsky), Bishop of Manhattan, vicar of the Eastern American Diocese
 Luke (Murianka), bishop of Syracuse, vicar of the Eastern American Diocese
 Alexander (Echevaria), bishop of Vevey, vicar of the Western European Diocese
 James (Corazza), bishop of Sonora, second vicar of the Western American Diocese
 Job (Bandmann), bishop of Stuttgart, vicar of the German Diocese

Retired Bishops 
 Retired Diocesan Bishops:
 Michael (Donskoff), retired Archbishop of Geneva & Western Europe
 Retired Vicar Bishops:
 Jerome (Shaw), retired Bishop of Manhattan
 Bishops Received into the ROCOR in Retirement:
 Jonah (Paffhausen), retired; former Archbishop of Washington, Metropolitan of All America and Canada in the OCA
 Nikolai (Soraich), retired; former Bishop of Sitka and Alaska in the OCA

Reposed (Dead)

First Hierarchs
 Anthony (Khrapovitsky), Metropolitan of Kiev & Galicia (28 July/10 August 1936)
 Anastasius (Gribanovsky), Metropolitan of Chişinău & Khotin (8/21 May 1965)
 Philaret (Voznesensky), Metropolitan of Eastern America & New York (8/21 November 1985)
 Vitaly (Ustinov), ret. Metropolitan of Eastern America & New York (25 September 2006)
 Laurus (Shkurla), Metropolitan of Eastern America & New York (16 March 2008)
 Hilarion (Kapral), Metropolitan of Eastern America & New York (16 May 2022)

Metropolitans
 Methodius (Gerasimov), Metropolitan of Harbin and Manchuria (15/28 March 1931)
 Innocent (Figurovsky), Metropolitan of Peking & China (15/28 June 1931)
 Seraphim (Lade), Metropolitan of Berlin & Germany (1/14 September 1950)
 Panteleimon (Rozhnovsky), ret. Metropolitan of Minsk & Byelorussia (17/30 December 1950)
 Augustine (Peterson), ret. Metropolitan of Riga and Latvia (4 October 1955)

Archbishops
 Simon (Vinogradov), Archbishop of Peking & China (11/24 February 1933)
 Gabriel (Chepur), Archbishop of Chelyabinsk & Troitsk (1/14 March 1933)
 Apollinarius (Koshevoy), Archbishop of North America (6/19 June 1933)
 Sergius (Petrov), ret. Archbishop of Black Sea & Novorossisk (11/24 January 1935)
 Damian (Govorov), ret. Archbishop of Tsarytsin (6/19 April 1936)
 Theophanes (Bystrov), ret. Archbishop of Poltava and Pereyaslavl (6/19 February 1940)
 Theophanes (Gavrilov), Archbishop of Kursk and Oboyan (1943)
 Tikhon (Lyaschenko), ret. Archbishop of Berlin & Germany (11/24 February 1945)
 Arsenius (Chagovets), ret. Archbishop of Winnipeg (4 October 1945)
 Benedict (Bobkovsky), Archbishop of Berlin & Germany (21 August/3 September 1950 or 1951)
 Theodore (Rafalsky), Archbishop of Sydney, Australia & New Zealand (23 April/6 May 1955)
 Joasaph (Skorodumov), Archbishop of Argentina & Paraguay (13/26 November 1955)
 Hieronymus (Chernov), Archbishop of Detroit & Flint (1/14 May 1957)
 Gregory (Borishkevich), Archbishop of Chicago & Cleveland (13/26 October 1957)
 Vitalis (Maximenko), Archbishop of Eastern America & Jersey City (8/21 March 1960)
 Tikhon (Troitsky), Archbishop of Western America & San Francisco (17/30 March 1963)
 Stephen (Sevbo), Archbishop of Vienna & Austria (12/25 January 1965)
 John (Maximovich), Archbishop of Western America & San Francisco (19 June/2 July 1966)
 Theodosius (Samoilovich), Archbishop of São Paulo & Brazil (13/29 February 1968)
 Leontius (Filippovich), Archbishop of Buenos Aires, Argentina, Chile & Paraguay (19 June/2 July 1971)
 Alexander (Lovchy), Archbishop of Berlin & Germany (29 August/11 September 1973)
 Ambrose (Merezhko), ret. Archbishop of Pittsburgh & West Pennsylvania (26 November/9 December 1975)
 Abercius (Taushev), Archbishop of Syracuse & Trinity (31 March/13 April 1976)
 Sabbas (Rayevsky), Archbishop of Sydney, Australia & New Zealand (4/17 April 1976)
 Nikon (Rklitsky), Archbishop of Washington & Florida (22 August/4 September 1976)
 Nicodemus (Nagayev), Archbishop of Richmond & Great Britain (4/17 October 1976)
 Andrew (Rymarenko), Archbishop of Rockland (29 June/12 July 1978)
 Theodosius (Putilin), Archbishop of Sydney, Australia & New Zealand (31 July/13 August 1980)
 Athanasius (Martos), Archbishop of Buenos Aires, Argentina & Paraguay (21 October/3 November 1983)
 Philotheus (Narko), Archbishop of Berlin & Germany (11/24 September 1986)
 Nathaniel (Lvov), Archbishop of Vienna & Austria (27 October/8 November 1986)
 Seraphim (Ivanov), Archbishop of Chicago, Detroit & the Midwest (12/25 July 1987)
 Anthony (Bartoshevich), Archbishop of Geneva & Western Europe (25 August/7 September 1993)
 Paul (Pavlov), ret. Archbishop of Sydney, Australia & New Zealand (2/15 February 1995)
 Anthony (Sinkevich), Archbishop of Los Angeles & Southern California (18/31 July 1996)
 Seraphim (Svezhevsky), ret. Archbishop of Caracas & Venezuela (31 August/13 September 1996)
 Anthony (Medvedev), Archbishop of West America and San-Francisco (23 September 2000)
 Seraphim (Dulgov), ret. Archbishop of Brussels and Western Europe (24 November 2003)
 Alypius (Gamanovich), ret. Archbishop of Chicago & Mid-America (28 April 2019)
 Agapit (Gorachek), Archbishop of Stuttgart, vicar of the German Diocese (28 May 2020)

Bishops
 Michael (Bogdanov), Bishop of Cheboksary (9/22 July 1925)
 Michael (Kosmodemyansky), Bishop of Alexandrovsk (9/22 September 1925)
 Jonah (Pokrovsky), Bishop of Hankou (7/20 October 1925)
 Elias (Gevargizov), Bishop of Salma in Urmia (December 1928)
 Nicholas (Karpov), Bishop of London (12/25 October 1932)
 Anthony (Dashkevich), ret. Bishop of Alaska & the Aleutians (15 March 1934)
 Gorazd (Pavlík), The Bishop of Czech (4 September 1942)
 Basil (Pavlovsky), Bishop of Vienna & Austria (10/23 October 1945)
 Eulogius (Markovsky), Bishop of Caracas & Venezuela (1951)
 Leontius (Bartoshevich), Bishop of Geneva (6/19 August 1956)
 John (Gevargizov), ret. Bishop of Salma & Urmia (1962)
 Agapetus (Kryzhanovsky), ret. Bishop of Goiana (27 August/9 September 1966)
 Sava (Saračević), ret. Bishop of Edmonton (17/30 January 1973)
 Nectarius (Kontsevich), Bishop of Seattle (4/26 January 1983)
 Nicander (Paderin), Bishop of São Paulo & Brazil (2/19 December 1987)
 Innocent (Petrov), Bishop of Buenos Aires, Argentina & Paraguay (10/23 December 1987)
 John (Legky), Bishop of Buenos Aires, Argentina & Paraguay (20 February/5 March 1995)
 Gregory (Grabbe), ret. Bishop of Washington & Florida (24 September /7 October 1995)
 Constantine (Jesensky), ret. Bishop of Boston (18/31 May 1996)
 Mitrophan (Znosko-Borovsky), Bishop of Boston (15 February 2002)
 Alexander (Mileant), Bishop of Buenos Aires and South America (18 September 2005)
 Ambrose (Cantacuzène), ret. Bishop of Geneva and Western Europe (22 July 2009)
 Daniel (Alexandrov), Bishop of Erie (26 April 2010)
 Barnabas (Prokofiev), defrocked (in 2014) bishop

Bishops Who Departed the Ranks of the ROCOR Hierarchy
 Living:
 Benjamin (Rusalenko), went into schism in 2001
 Agathangel (Pashkovsky), went into schism in 2007
 Eutychus (Kurochkin), went Moscow Patriarchate in 2007
 Reposed:
 Mitrophan (Abramov), went Serbian Orthodox Church in 1922
 Benjamin (Fedchenkov), went Ecumenical Patriarchate of Constantinople in 1923
 Platon (Rozhdestvensky), went Northern-American metropolis in 1924
 Eulogius (Georgievsky), went Western-European Metropolis in 1926
 Vladimir (Tikhonitsky), went Western-European Metropolis in 1926
 Sergius (Korolyov), went Western-European Metropolis in 1926
 Hermogenes (Maximov), went schism in 1942
 Meletius (Zaborovsky), went Moscow Patriarchate in 1945
 Victor (Svyatin), went Moscow Patriarchate in 1945
 Nestor (Anisimov), went Moscow Patriarchate in 1945
 Juvenal (Kilin), went Moscow Patriarchate in 1945
 Demetrius (Voznesensky), went Moscow Patriarchate in 1945
 Alexis (Panteleyev), went Moscow Patriarchate in 1945
 Seraphim (Loukianov), went Moscow Patriarchate in 1945
 Seraphim (Sobolev), went Moscow Patriarchate in 1945
 Philip (Gardner), Bishop of Potsdam. Defrocked in 1945. (9 December 1898 - 26 February 1984)
 Macarius (Ilyinsky), went Moscow Patriarchate in 1946
 Paul (Meletiev), went Catholic church in 1946
 Theophilus (Pashkovsky), went Northern-American metropolis in 1946
 Leontius (Turkevich), went Northern-American metropolis in 1946
 Demetrius (Magan), went Northern-American metropolis in 1946 (1 April 1970)
 John (Zlobin), went Northern-American metropolis in 1946
 Panteleimon (Rudyk), went Moscow Patriarchate in 1959
 James (Toombs), Bishop of Manhattan, went schism in 1959
 John-Nectaire (Kovalevsky), went schism in 1966
 Jakob (Akkersdijk), Bishop of Hague; went Moscow Patriarchate in 1972
 Kyrill (Yonchev), went OCA in 1976
 Valentine (Rusantsov), went schism in 1994
 Lazarus (Zhurbenko), went schism in 2001

External links 
 https://groups.yahoo.com/group/orthodox-synod/message/961
 http://krotov.info/spravki/persons/20person/karlovch.html

 
Russian Orthodox